The following is a list of Egyptian hieroglyphs with triconsonantal phonetic value.

See also
Transliteration of ancient Egyptian
Egyptian uniliteral signs
Egyptian biliteral signs
List of hieroglyphs

References 

James P. Allen, Middle Egyptian: An Introduction to the Language and Culture of Hieroglyphs, Cambridge University Press, 15 Apr 2010  29ff.

External links
 omniglot.com